Ramat Aviv HaHadasha is a residential neighborhood in Tel Aviv, Israel. It is located in the northwestern part of the city, north of Shikun Lamed and to the west of Neve Avivim.

Built in the 1990s, it is a relatively modern portion of the city, with white, cream and beige apartment buildings.

References

Neighborhoods of Tel Aviv

he:רמת אביב#רמת אביב החדשה